Lichtenstein's jerboa (Eremodipus lichtensteini) is a species of rodent in the family Dipodidae. It is monotypic within the genus Eremodipus.
It is found in Kazakhstan, Turkmenistan, and Uzbekistan.

References

Dipodidae
Mammals of Central Asia
Mammals described in 1927
Taxonomy articles created by Polbot